AMK Baru was a campaign cooperation team-up to contest the Youth Wing or Angkatan Muda KeADILan (AMK) of People's Justice Party (PKR) leadership election in 2014.

The AMK Baru team was formed and led by Amirudin Shari in February 2014, one month after the AMK Vice Chief and Selangor state assemblyman for Batu Caves then announced his candidacy for the PKR Youth chief's post in the 2014 party leadership election. He soon announced the manifesto for AMK Baru and unveiled his team line-up.

In the three-way competition, AMK Baru faction obviously dominates the party polls with landslide victories in popular states for PKR such as Selangor and Sabah while receiving good number of polls in Penang, Kedah, Kelantan, and Perak. However, after several branches objection and ballots boxes recount, the final results over turned Amirudin's initial victory into defeat to Nik Nazmi Nik Ahmad for the post of PKR Youth Chief.

For the record, the Deputy Chief AMK post, 3 Vice Chiefs AMK, and 16 out of 20 Central AMK Committee Members were won by representatives from AMK Baru which had led the AMK for the term from 2014 to 2018.

See also
 People's Justice Party (Malaysia)
 2014 People's Justice Party leadership election

References

People's Justice Party (Malaysia)
Politics of Malaysia